Lyonsville may refer to:

Lyonsville, California, an unincorporated community
Lyonsville, Indiana, an unincorporated community